The 1955 European Rowing Championships for women were rowing championships held in the Romanian capital city of Bucharest from 4 to 7 August. The competition for men was held later in the month in Ghent. The women competed in five boat classes (W1x, W2x, W4x+, W4+, W8+).

German participation
The National Olympic Committee of the GDR was granted provisional membership in 1955 and as a next step, East Germany tried to gain membership of the individual sporting organisations that participated in Olympic disciplines. In July 1955, the East German rowing association applied for a license from FISA, the International Rowing Federation, to be able to nominate their rowers at the European Championships in Bucharest (women) and Ghent (men). FISA's response was that the next congress, to be held just prior to the championships in Ghent, will decide on the matter. Therefore, East German teams could not compete in 1955. At the congress, East Germany was unanimously accepted as a new member. The only West German competitor was Ingrid Scholz, who had won silver in single sculls in 1954; she came sixth in 1955.

Medal summary – women's events

References

European Rowing Championships
European Rowing Championships
Rowing
Rowing
Sports competitions in Bucharest
Euro
1955 in women's rowing